The 1904–05 Michigan State Spartans men's basketball team represented Michigan State University in the 1904–05 college men's basketball season. The school was known as State Agricultural College at this time. The head coach was Chester Brewer coaching the team in his second season. The team captain was Foley Tutle. They finished the season 5–3.

|-
!colspan=9 style=| Regular season
|-

References

Michigan State Spartans men's basketball seasons
Michigan State
Michigan State
Michigan State